Volleyball events were contested at the 1970 Summer Universiade in Turin, Italy.

References
 Universiade volleyball medalists on HickokSports

U
1970 Summer Universiade
Volleyball at the Summer Universiade